Sarvajanikarige Suvarnavakasha is a 2019 Kannada-language comedy film written and directed by Anoop Ramaswamy Kashyap, based on the short story The Necklace (1884) by Guy de Maupassant. The film stars Rishi and Dhanya Balakrishna in her Kannada debut. Janardhan Chikkanna wrote the script and acted as producer for the film.

Plot

MBA students Vedanth aka Vedhu and Janhavi are lovers. Janhavi goes with Vedhu to wear the golden chain to celebrate her birthday. After the celebration, they go to the hotel, where a heated argument occurs between Vedhu and another group of boys. This then turns into a brawl. During the brawl, Janhavi lost her chain, which is given by her mother. After searching for the chain, it was not found. Vedanth says he'll purchase a new chain by the end of the day.

Vedanth's father who needs money takes loans from everyone. He put his house and wife Mangalya Sutra as collateral with a pawn business. Finally, Vedhu pawns his bike for money but, he only got half of the money needed to buy a new chain. Raghu, a friend of Vedhu suggests gambling to double the money. Vedhu only has 35K which what he got for selling the bike. The chain costs 70K, so Vedhu agreed to gamble. Things turned for the worst in betting, they lost 70K. Now in debt, the two have to pay their dues back to Shiva who is in charge of this business. Shiva only gives them till 11 in the morning to pay up otherwise, they'll be dead. After many shenanigans they finally get enough funds to pay back Shiva due to their marketing talents. Janhavi, who is the mother of Padma, found the chain all along in her bag. It was dropped accidentally when the brawl had occurred. Vendhu, after all, was able to pay back Shiva, get his bike back, and finally his mother's Mangalya Sutra.

Cast
 Rishi as Vedanth aka Vedu
 Dhanya Balakrishna as Janhavi
 Siddu Moolimani as Raghu
 Dattanna as Devraj
 Rangayana Raghu as Single hand Shiva
 Mitra as Yeshappa
 Papa Pandu Shalini as Padma

Soundtrack

References

External links
 

2019 films
Features based on short films
2010s masala films
2010s Kannada-language films
Indian black comedy films
Films shot in Karnataka
2010s comedy thriller films
2019 comedy films